Zayo Group Holdings, Inc., or Zayo Group, is a privately held company headquartered in Boulder, Colorado, U.S. with European headquarters in London, England. The company provides communications infrastructure services, including fiber and bandwidth connectivity, colocation and cloud infrastructure. Zayo's primary customer segments include wireless carriers, national carriers, ISPs, enterprises and government agencies. Zayo Group was built largely through acquisitions; it took over thirty companies from 2007 to 2014, including AboveNet and 360networks. An initial public offering of stock raised $600 million in 2014. In May 2019, Zayo Group agreed to be acquired by global investment firms EQT Partners and Digital Colony Partners in a deal valued at $14.3 billion.

Founding and acquisition history
Zayo was founded in 2007 by Dan Caruso and John Scarano as a Delaware corporation. In 2007, Zayo acquired Memphis Networx, VoicePipe, Onvoy Inc, PPL Telcom and Indiana Fiber Works.

In 2008, Zayo acquired Columbia Fiber Solution, Adesta Communications assets, two sets of fiber assets from Citynet, two sets of fiber assets from Northwest Telephone, and CenturyTel Regional Markets.

In 2009, Zayo acquired FiberNet Telcom Group, Inc.

In 2010, Zayo acquired AGL Networks, American Fiber Systems, and Dolphini's Cummins Station data center and colocation services.

In 2011, Zayo acquired MarquisNet data center business in Las Vegas, and 360networks.

In 2012 Zayo acquired AboveNet, FiberGate, Arialink, US Carrier Telecom, First Telecom Services, and Maryland-based Litecast/Balticore.

In 2013 Zayo acquired Austin-based data center operator Core NAP, Access Communications, Midwest-based dark fiber operator FiberLink, and Corelink Data Centers.

In 2014, Zayo acquired Dallas-based data center operator CoreXchange, French network operator Neo Telecoms SAS and UK-based Geo Networks.

In 2015, the company acquired Latisys, IdeaTek Systems and Viatel. In 2016, Zayo acquired a new Dallas, TX data center from Stream Data Centers, Clearview International and Allstream, Canada's main facilities-based inter-exchange carrier which has its roots in the railway telegraph business CNCP Telecommunications. As of July 2016, Zayo has completed 39 acquisitions.

On November 30, 2016, Zayo Group Holdings Inc said it would buy smaller rival Electric Lightwave for $1.42 billion in cash to expand its fiber network on the U.S. West Coast.

In November 2017, Zayo purchased Spread Networks, a company that operated an 825-mile-long fiber route connecting New York and Chicago.

In January 2018, Zayo announced they would be acquiring Optic Zoo Networks, a Vancouver, BC based fiber operation.

In May 2019, Zayo announced an agreement to be acquired by EQT Partners and Digital Colony.

In January 2022, Zayo announced they would be acquiring QOS Networks from majority owner M/C Partners.

Onvoy spinoff
On June 13, 2014, Onvoy spun off from Zayo Group Holdings. On June 16, 2014, Onvoy LLC acquired the assets of Vitelity, a voice over IP provider based in Denver, Colorado. On September 3, 2015, Onvoy LLC acquired Broadvox Communications, a competitive local exchange carrier VoIP service provider for business telecommunications.

Network and services
Zayo owns a fiber network that spans more than 130,000 route miles in North America and Europe. Zayo operates a Tier 1 IP network, with settlement-free peering with all other Tier 1 providers. Zayo's services include dark fiber, wavelengths, SONET, Ethernet, SD-WAN, IP services, colocation, wireless backhaul and small cells.

References

American companies established in 2007
Telecommunications companies established in 2007
2007 establishments in Colorado
Companies based in Boulder, Colorado
Telecommunications companies of the United States
Companies formerly listed on the New York Stock Exchange
2014 initial public offerings
Private equity portfolio companies
2020 mergers and acquisitions
Tier 1 networks